Pluto pup may refer to:

Pluto (Disney), a cartoon character also known as Pluto the Pup
Pluto Pup, Australian regional name for a corn dog